Company A 1st Battalion 181st Infantry Regiment is the oldest active company in the 181st Infantry Regiment. In the National Guard, companies can share the history of the regiment to which they are assigned, but also may have additional unique company history and lineage. Company A traces its history to 1639, but also shares the history of the 104th Infantry Regiment and the 181st Infantry Regiment (United States).

The company traces its history to 14 November 1639, when it was first mustered as the Springfield Trained Band. It later served in the Continental Army during the American Revolution, and with Union forces in the American Civil War. It then fought with the U.S. Army during War with Spain, and in the Mexican Border Campaign. In March 1917 it became part of the 104th Infantry Regiment, a federalized Massachusetts National Guard unit. World War I and World War II service followed. Most recently Company A has served in Bosnia, in New Orleans following Hurricane Katrina, in Kosovo and in Afghanistan.

History

Formation and colonial operations
The present Company A of the 181st Infantry was first mustered in December 1639 in Springfield. The company served against the Dutch on Long Island in 1673–74, In King Philip's War (1675–77), at Turner's Falls in 1676, In King William's War (1688–98), Queen Anne's War (1703–13), King George's War (1744–48) and in the French and Indian War (1754–63).

Massachusetts Army and American Revolution
In the Revolutionary War, the company served as Burt's Company at Boston in 1775, with detachments serving throughout the war.

During Shays' Rebellion (1786–77) the company fought against the rebels to defend the Federal Arsenal in Springfield.

In 1798, the company became the Springfield Artillery, and served in the defenses of Boston during the War of 1812.

Civil War
In 1844, reorganized as Company E of the 10th Light Infantry Regiment. Mobilized on 21 June 1861 as Company E (Springfield Rifles) of the 10th Massachusetts Regiment. Served throughout the Civil War with the Army of the Potomac.

National Guard and overseas service
Mobilized for service in the War with Spain on 9 May 1898. The company served with the 2nd Massachusetts Infantry in the Santiago (Cuba) Campaign fighting at El Caney and was mustered out of service on 3 November 1898.

The land forces of the Massachusetts Volunteer Militia were redesignated as the Massachusetts National Guard on 15 November 1907.

In June 1916 the Company was sent to the Mexican border as Company B of the 2nd Massachusetts Regiment. The 2nd Mass. was based at Columbus New Mexico, and was the only National Guard Regiment to cross the border into Mexico with General Pershing’s Punitive Expedition.

World War I
In March 1917 the Springfield Rifles was designated as Company B, 104th Infantry Regiment of the 26th Yankee Division for service in the First World War. In France the company served in all of campaigns of the Yankee Division and was awarded the French Croix de Guerre with Gilt Star for the heroic fight at Apremont on 10–13 April 1918. This was the first time in U.S. history that an American unit was decorated for bravery by a foreign power.

World War II
The Springfield Rifles was mobilized in January 1941 for one year of training with the Yankee Division. The year of training ended in December 1941 but the company's service continued after the Japanese attack on Pearl Harbor brought the United States into the Second World War. Company B Deployed to Europe with the 104th Infantry Regiment and fought from Normandy across Germany to meet the Soviets in Czechoslovakia at war's end. The 104th awarded the Croix de Guerre and Fourragere by France for actions in breaching the Siegfried Line. The company served in the Army of Occupation in Czechoslovakia and Austria until 1946.

In 1946, the Springfield Rifles were re-established and became Company B 1st Battalion 104th Infantry. The Company served through the Cold War.

Later service
In August 2001, the Springfield Rifles now designated as Company A 1-104 IN, headquartered in Agawam MA, mobilized for service in Bosnia-Herzegovina as an element of the NATO Stabilization Force. (SFOR 10)

In September 2005, Company A mobilized as an element of JTF Yankee for rescue and security operations in New Orleans following Hurricane Katrina.

On 1 December 2005, the 1st Battalion 104th Infantry Regiment (United States) was deactivated and the remaining units were reconstituted and integrated into the 1st Battalion 181st Infantry Regiment (United States).

In August 2006, the Springfield Rifles now designated as Company A, 1-181 IN, mobilized for service in Kosovo as an element of the NATO Kosovo Force. (KFOR 8). Conducted Peace Enforcement Operations in southern Kosovo.

In August 2010, Company A, 1-181 IN deployed for one year of service with the International Security Force in Afghanistan in support of Operation Enduring Freedom. The company provided command and control for Camp Julien in Kabul and conducted security operations in Kunar, Uruzgan and Kapisa Provinces in Afghanistan.

In March 2017, Company A, 1-181 IN deployed for one year of service with the Multinational Force and Observers (MFO) in support of the peace treaty between Egypt and Israel in Sinai, Egypt. The company provided observation, and security operations in the MFO's Forward Operating Base North (FOB-N). FOB-N is located at el Gorah in north Sinai approximately 20 kilometers south of the Mediterranean coastline. FOB-N provides required facilities for both the operational and logistical needs of the MFO in the northern sector of Zone C.

Battles
King Philip's War, Springfield Train Band
 Battle of Bloody Brook
 Battle of Turner's Falls

French and Indian wars, Springfield Foot
 Siege of Louisbourg (1745)
 Battle of Lake George
 Ticonderoga

American Revolutionary War, Burt's Company
 Siege of Boston

American Civil War, Company E, 10th Massachusetts Infantry
 Peninsula Campaign
 Battle of Antietam
 Battle of Fredericksburg
 Battle of Chancellorsville
 Battle of Gettysburg
 Battle of the Wilderness
 Battle of Spotsylvania
 Battle of Cold Harbor
 Battle of Petersburg
 Virginia 1863

Spanish–American War, Springfield Rifles, 2nd Massachusetts Infantry
 Santiago, Cuba (Battle of El Caney)

Mexican Border campaign, H Company, 2nd Massachusetts Infantry

World War I, B Company, 104th Infantry Regiment (United States)
 Champagne Marne
 Aisne Marne (Battle of Château-Thierry (1918))
 Battle of Saint-Mihiel
 Meuse-Argonne Offensive
 Isle De France 1918
 Lorraine 1918

World War II, B Company, 104th Infantry Regiment (United States)
 Northern France
 Rhineland
 Ardennes-Alsace (Battle of the Bulge)
 Central Europe

Global War on Terror, Company A 1-104 IN / Company A 1-181 Infantry
 Bosnia SFOR
 Kosovo Kosovo Force
 Afghanistan War (2001–2021)

Unit decorations

See also
 181st Infantry Regiment (United States)
 104th Infantry Regiment (United States)
 Headquarters Company 1-181 Infantry (Wellington Rifles)
 Company B 1-181 Infantry
 Company C 1-181 Infantry (Cambridge City Guard)
 Company D 1-181 Infantry (Hudson Light Guards)
 1181 Forward Support Company

Notes

Military units and formations in Massachusetts
Companies of the United States Army National Guard
Military units and formations established in 1639